Neves may refer to:

People
Neves (surname), a common surname in Portugal, Brazil, and the Spanish region of Galicia

Places

Angola
Neves, Angola, commune in the municipality of Humpata, province of Huíla

Brazil
Neves Paulista, municipality in São Paulo
Presidente Tancredo Neves, municipality in Bahia
Riachão das Neves, municipality in Bahia
Ribeirão das Neves, municipality in of Minas Gerais
Tancredo Neves International Airport, in Belo Horizonte

Portugal
Neves, the other name of the small parish of Norte Grande (Azores), in the Azores

São Tomé and Príncipe
Neves, São Tomé and Príncipe, small town on the north west coast of São Tomé Island
Neves Ferreira, São Tomé and Príncipe, village in the southern part of the island of Príncipe

Spain
As Neves, in Galicia

Other
Neves (video game), a Nintendo DS puzzle game by Yuke's